Heme ligase (EC 4.99.1.8, heme detoxification protein, HDP, hemozoin synthase) is an enzyme with systematic name Fe3+:ferriprotoporphyrin IX ligase (β-hematin-forming). This enzyme catalyses the following reaction:

 2 ferriprotoporphyrin IX  beta-hematin

This heme detoxifying enzyme is found in Plasmodium parasites.

References

External links 
 

EC 4.99.1